Pablo Albano and Lucas Arnold were the defending champions but they competed with different partners that year, Albano with Alexandre Simoni and Arnold with Gastón Etlis.

Albano and Simoni lost in the quarterfinals to Mariano Hood and Sebastián Prieto.

Arnold and Etlis lost in the semifinals to Martín Rodríguez and André Sá.

Hood and Prieto won in the final 6–2, 6–4 against Rodríguez and Sá.

Seeds
Champion seeds are indicated in bold text while text in italics indicates the round in which those seeds were eliminated.

 Lucas Arnold /  Gastón Etlis (semifinals)
 Pablo Albano /  Alexandre Simoni (quarterfinals)
 Antonio Prieto /  Eyal Ran (first round)
 Devin Bowen /  Dušan Vemić (semifinals)

Draw

External links
 2001 Cerveza Club Colombia Open Doubles draw

Bancolombia Open
2001 ATP Tour